United Nations Security Council resolution 956, adopted unanimously on 10 November 1994, after recalling Chapter XII of the United Nations Charter which established the United Nations Trusteeship system and Resolution 21 (1947) which approved the Trusteeship Territory of the Japanese Mandated Islands (since known as the Trust Territory of the Pacific Islands), the Council  determined that, in the light of entry into force of a new status agreement for the Republic of Palau, the objectives of the Trusteeship Agreement had been completed and therefore ended the status of Palau as a Trust Territory.

The Council noted that the United States was the Administering Authority of the Trust Territory and was satisfied that the people of Palau had freely exercised their right to self-determination in approving the new status agreement. Approval for Palau to join the United Nations was given in Resolution 963.

See also
 Compact of Free Association
 List of United Nations Security Council Resolutions 901 to 1000 (1994–1995)
 United Nations Security Council Resolution 683
 United Nations Trust Territories

References

External links
 
Text of the Resolution at undocs.org

 0956
United Nations Trusteeship Council
 0956
1994 in Palau
November 1994 events